Pasenadi (c. 6th century BCE) was an  ruler of Kosala. Sāvatthī was his capital. He succeeded after . He was a prominent  (lay follower) of Gautama Buddha, and built many Buddhist monasteries for the Buddha.

Life
Pasenadi studied in Taxila in his early life. He was the king of Kosala (modern Oudh or Awadh). His first queen was a Magadhan princess, a sister of king Bimbisara. His second and chief queen was Vāsavakhattiyā, a  girl, daughter of the chief of garland-makers for Mahānāma. From this marriage, he had a son, Viḍūḍabha and a daughter, Princess Vajira, who was later married to Ajatashatru. He married his sister Kosala Devi to Bimbisara.

Reign
By the time of Pasenadi, Kosala had become the suzerain of the Kālāma tribal republic, and Pasenadi's realm maintained friendly relations with the powerful Licchavi tribe which lived to the east of his kingdom.

During Pasenadi's reign, a Mallaka named Bandhula who had received education in Takṣaśilā, had offered his services as a general to the Kauśalya king so as to maintain the good relations between the Mallakas and Kosala. Later, Bandhula, along with his wife Mallikā, violated the  sacred tank of the Licchavikas, which resulted in armed hostilities between the Kauśalya and the Licchavikas. Bandhula was later treacherously murdered along with his sons by Pasenadi. In retaliation, some Mallakas helped Pasenadi's son Viḍūḍabha usurp the throne of Kosala to avenge the death of Bandhula, after which Pasenadi fled from Kosala and died in front of the gates of the Māgadhī capital of Rājagaha. 

The Puranas instead of  mention the name of Kṣudraka as his successor.

References

Citations

Sources

 
 
 
 

Bodhisattvas
Disciples of Gautama Buddha
People from Kosala
People from Shravasti district
Solar dynasty
6th-century BC Indian monarchs
Indian Buddhist monarchs